The Reverend Frederick Thatcher (1814 – 19 October 1890) was an English and New Zealand architect and clergyman.

He was born at Hastings to a long-established Sussex family. He designed the workhouse in Battle, East Sussex in 1840.

With his dead wife's brother Isaac Newton Watt, (1821–1886) he sailed from Plymouth on the barque Himalaya, and landed in New Plymouth, New Zealand, on 23 December 1843. Thatcher worked in New Plymouth then Auckland. He entered St John's College, Auckland to train for the ministry in 1848, and was ordained deacon the same year and priest in 1853. He designed the college's chapel, consecrated in 1847.

He was the first incumbent of St Matthew's, Auckland, and at the same time was Chaplain to the Forces. In December 1856 he was obliged to leave on account of ill health. The next four years he spent in England, and from December 1859 he was curate at Winwick, Northamptonshire. He returned to New Zealand in July 1861 and was appointed to St Paul's parish, Wellington, where he remained until 1864, when he had to resign again for health reasons. He designed St Paul's Church (1866), now Old St Paul's, Wellington and Kinder House on Ayr Street, Parnell.

He returned to England in 1868, and settled in Lichfield where he became secretary first to Bishop George Augustus Selwyn and then to Bishop William Maclagan. He retired in 1882 and in the following year was made a prebendary canon. He was associated with Bishop Selwyn and the founding of Selwyn College, Cambridge. He died at Bakewell, Derbyshire, where his son Ernest Grey Thatcher was curate, in 1890.

He designed many New Zealand churches, which were constructed of wood in the Gothic Revival style, as well as hospitals and schools. He was associated with the first Anglican Bishop of New Zealand, George Augustus Selwyn in planning several "Selwyn" churches in New Zealand, among them  St Stephen's Chapel in Parnell and All Saints Church, Howick.

He married, first, in 1840, Elizabeth Watt (died 1842), and second, in 1849, Caroline Wright of New Plymouth. One son, Ernest, was born of the second marriage.

References

 Biography in the 1966 Encyclopaedia of New Zealand
 An Excellent Recruit: Frederick Thatcher, architect, priest and private secretary in early New Zealand by Margaret Alington (2007, Polygraphia, Auckland) 

1814 births
1890 deaths
New Zealand architects
Gothic Revival architects
19th-century New Zealand Anglican priests
 
English ecclesiastical architects
New Zealand ecclesiastical architects
19th-century English architects
English emigrants to New Zealand
Architects from Sussex